Jean Krombach (17 July 1910 – 4 January 1999) was a Luxembourgian sprinter. He competed in the men's 400 metres at the 1936 Summer Olympics.

References

1910 births
1999 deaths
Athletes (track and field) at the 1936 Summer Olympics
Luxembourgian male sprinters
Olympic athletes of Luxembourg
Sportspeople from Luxembourg City